Zoltán Cziffra (born 10 November 1942 in Keszthely) is a retired Hungarian triple jumper.

He won the silver medals at the 1969 European Indoor Games and the 1969 European Championships. He also finished fifth at the 1970 European Indoor Championships and sixth at the 1971 European Indoor Championships.

He became the Hungarian triple jump champion in 1969, 1974 and 1975, rivalling with Henrik Kalocsai and Gábor Katona. He also became Hungarian indoor champion in 1975 and 1977.

References

Living people
Hungarian male triple jumpers
Olympic athletes of Hungary
Athletes (track and field) at the 1968 Summer Olympics
1942 births
European Athletics Championships medalists
Sportspeople from Keszthely